The 1737 Kamchatka earthquake occurred on October 17 or 16 near the southern tip of present-day Russia's Kamchatka Peninsula. The shock was felt at approximately 03:00  local time or 16:00 UTC by residents on the peninsula and Kuril Islands. The earthquake struck at a shallow depth of roughly 40 km (25 miles) beneath the peninsula. The earthquake had an estimated magnitude of 9.0–9.3 on the moment magnitude scale.

Earthquake
The earthquake was associated with thrust faulting on the subduction zone marked by the Kuril-Kamchatka Trench. Calculation of the earthquake magnitude using tsunami data yielded a moment magnitude of 9.3.

Studies of the earthquake has placed the moment magnitude of this earthquake at 9.0 to 9.3 and 8.3 to 8.5 on the surface wave magnitude. The tsunamis generated by this earthquake is thought to be the most destructive and largest ever sourced from the region, alongside the 1952 earthquake. It is thought to be similar in size or possibly larger than the 1952 earthquake.

Descriptions
Stepan Krasheninnikov, a Russian explorer, reported the effects of the earthquake in his 1755 publication Description of Kamchatka Land. According to him, the earthquake lasted 15 minutes and was extremely violent. Many homes, constructed of wood and skin, belonging to the natives were obliterated. Many aftershocks were felt even when the tsunami struck. Aftershocks continued until the spring of 1738.

Co-seismic deformation along the coasts was so drastic that natives could not recognize the region or locate their settlements.

Along the Okhotsk Sea coast of Kamchatka, the earthquake and its effects were not noticeable.

Tsunami
On the northern Kuril Islands, the tsunami had an estimated height of 20 meters, and 30 meters in the Avacha Bay. A maximum tsunami amplitude of 12–16 meters was estimated on Amchitka based on evaluating the height where driftwood was found on the island. When Georg Wilhelm Steller, a German scientist and explorer visited the region in 1740, he noted the bones of marine mammals and driftwood discovered well above the shoreline. Trees were also found deposited on a ridge with a height of 230 feet or 70 meters. Krasheninnikov's book mentioned a tsunami measuring three sazhen or 6.3 meters inundating the coast. Another wave measuring 30 sazhen or 63 meters swept through the entire coast, killing many natives and destroying their settlements. The force of the tsunami was so powerful that it stripped away dirt and sand, revealing the basement rocks of the Second Kuril Strait.

See also 
 Kamchatka earthquakes
 1841 Kamchatka earthquake – Another  9.0 earthquake in the same region
 List of earthquakes in Russia
 List of tsunamis
 List of historical earthquakes
 List of megathrust earthquakes

References 

1737 earthquakes
Megathrust earthquakes in Russia
Tsunamis in Russia
1737 tsunamis
1737 in the Russian Empire 
History of the Kamchatka Peninsula
Earthquakes in the Russian Far East
1737 disasters in the Russian Empire